Grégoire Barrère (born 16 February 1994) is a French professional tennis player. He has a career high ATP singles ranking of No. 58, which was achieved on 20 February 2023. He also has a career-high ATP doubles ranking of No. 161 achieved on 26 April 2021. Barrère has won five ATP Challenger Tour and six ITF Futures singles titles as well as five Challenger and six ITF Futures doubles titles in his career.

Professional career

2016-17: Grand Slam debut
Barrère made his Grand Slam main-draw debut at the 2016 French Open, where he received a wildcard, but lost to David Goffin in the first round.

2018: Top 100 debut
He was awarded a wildcard to the 2018 French Open, where he lost to Radu Albot in the first round after leading 2 sets to 0.

2019: Best season, Grand Slam success, Top 80
In 2019, he succeeded to qualify and reach the second round of two Grand Slams 2019 Wimbledon Championships and the US Open, and also reached the second round of the 2019 French Open as a wildcard where he lost in four sets to 10th seed Karen Khachanov after winning the third set 6–0. He also achieved in the same year the main draws of a few ATP 250 tournaments.

2020-21: Australian Open second round
At the 2020 Australian Open he also reached the second round as a direct entry, thus reaching this round of all four Grand Slams. 
He also entered directly into the 2020 French Open main draw.

He reached the final of the 2021 Play In Challenger in Lille for a third time in his career at this tournament but lost to Zizou Bergs. 
He was awarded a wildcard into the 2021 French Open.

2022: Fifth French Open wildcard, Two Challenger titles, back to top 100 
In May, he was awarded his fifth wildcard into the main draw of the 2022 French Open. He won his second match at this Major defeating Taro Daniel in five sets.

He won his fourth Challenger title in 2022 Open d'Orléans defeating fourth seed Quentin Halys. He became the first Challenger champion for 2022 to defeat four Top-100 players en route to the title (fifth since 2010): fifth seed Marton Fucsovics, third seed Richard Gasquet, second seed Hugo Gaston. As a result he moved close to 40 positions up to world No. 116 on 3 October 2022.
Following his second Challenger title for the season in Brest, he moved close to 20 positions up in the rankings to No. 92 on 31 October 2022.

2023: Top 60 and Masters 1000 debut
He reached the top 75 on 6 February 2023 following the Open Quimper, where he won his sixth Challenger title.

At the  Rotterdam Open he qualified for the main draw and defeated David Goffin in straight sets. As a result he moved more than 10 positions up to a career high in the top 60 in the rankings.

He made his Masters 1000 debut at the 2023 BNP Paribas Open.

Performance timeline

Singles

Doubles

Challenger and Futures finals

Singles: 23 (12–11)

Doubles: 21 (11–10)

References

External links 
 
 

1994 births
Living people
French male tennis players
People from Charenton-le-Pont
Sportspeople from Saint-Maur-des-Fossés
21st-century French people